William Maldon was a sixteenth-century English protestant activist.

References

English Protestants
16th-century English people